International Boulevard (in Oakland), East 14th Street (in San Leandro), and Mission Boulevard (in Hayward, Union City, and Fremont) are a major road in Alameda County, California. The section now known as International Boulevard was also named East 14th Street until 1996, owing to its position in the East Oakland grid plan; though fully deprecated within the city of Oakland today, this name is still commonly used, especially in casual speech. (East 14th Street is the only correct name in the city of San Leandro to this day.) Mission Boulevard is so named as number 43300 is the location of Mission San José.

South of 42nd Avenue and the end of California State Route 77 (CA-77, SR 77, or "Highway 77"), the street is signed as CA-185; after the junction with CA-92 (which carries the San Mateo Bridge) in Hayward, it is signed as part of CA-238; between I-680 and I-880, it is signed as the relatively obscure CA-262. The Oakland portion features median strip boarding platforms to accommodate the AC Transit Tempo bus rapid transit line.

International Boulevard, East 14th Street, and Mission Boulevard are each among the longest continuously-named streets in the Bay Area individually. The numbers along the International Boulevard are notable in that they are continuous, growing with no large gaps from 102 International Boulevard (at 1st Avenue, one block from Lake Merritt), to 10970 International Boulevard (at the intersection with Durant Avenue on the Oakland/San Leandro border).

In 1996, the city of Oakland renamed its portion of East 14th Street as International Boulevard to acknowledge the cultural diversity of the route, and to address the stigma of the segment being seen as a high-crime area. Fruitvale, a neighborhood of Oakland with a large Hispanic population, is centered on International Boulevard's intersections with Fruitvale and 35th Avenues, and has seen considerable economic growth in recent years. Immediately northwest of Fruitvale are many businesses long owned locally by East and Southeast Asian residents. Much of the rest of International Boulevard is made up of predominantly low-income African-American communities.

Some portions of International Boulevard have gained a reputation as areas of prostitution, and are part of Oakland's continuing troubles with underage prostitution. An award-winning short film about underage prostitution, International Boulevard: A Documentary, covers the issue of Commercially Sexually Exploited Children (CSEC) in Oakland, and on a national level.

Transportation
AC Transit 1T runs on the boulevard north of Davis Street, running in the median with center boarding islands between Durant Avenue and 20th Avenue.

References and sources

Streets in Alameda County, California
Streets in Oakland, California